Abu Hena is an Indian National Congress politician, who was a cabinet minister and is a five-time Member of the Legislative Assembly.

Personal life
A post graduate with a law degree he is an advocate, practising in Calcutta High Court. He is son of Abdus Sattar, who was a cabinet minister in the Siddhartha Shankar Ray government.

Political career
He was elected from the Lalgola (Vidhan Sabha constituency) in West Bengal in 1991, 1996, 2001, 2006 and 2011.
 
He was the Minister for Fisheries and the Minister for Food Processing Industries & Horticulture in the Government of West Bengal in 2011. Abu Hena resigned along with other Congress ministers in September 2012.

He is secretary of the state Congress committee.

References 

 

Living people
State cabinet ministers of West Bengal
West Bengal MLAs 1991–1996
West Bengal MLAs 1996–2001
West Bengal MLAs 2001–2006
West Bengal MLAs 2006–2011
West Bengal MLAs 2011–2016
West Bengal MLAs 2016–2021
People from Murshidabad district
Indian National Congress politicians
1951 births
20th-century Bengalis
21st-century Bengalis